The  is a light anti-tank vehicle developed by Japan in the late 1950s. It mounts two M40 106 mm recoilless rifles as its main armament.

Development 
In the mid-1950s the Japan Ground Self-Defense Force contracted for one prototype each from Komatsu (SS1) and Mitsubishi Heavy Industries (SS2) powered by a 110 hp six-cylinder diesel engine and fitted with two  recoilless rifles. They were delivered in 1956. A second series of prototypes was built with 4 recoilless rifles, but adoption of the 105mm American M40 recoilless rifle forced the reversion to two weapons. The Type 60 was designed for ambush attacks against enemy tanks, and mounting four weapons gave the vehicle a rather high profile. A third series of three heavier prototypes was built by Komatsu as SS4, with a more powerful engine, a new transmission and clutch and a two-speed auxiliary transmission. They were accepted into service in September 1960.

Starting in 1974, a 150 hp Komatsu SA4D105 air-cooled, 4-cylinder diesel engine was fitted.

Operation 

The commander is seated to the left of the two weapons and his position is attached to their mounting so that he remains at the same height when they are elevated for firing. The M40s can be fired from the lowered position, but their traverse is limited to 20°, elevation to +10° and depression to -5°. The elevation mechanism is manually operated and allows the weapons to traverse 30° to each side. The loader is seated to the left of the commander and must exit through his rear-opening hatch to reload the recoilless rifles while on top of the engine deck or behind the vehicle.

Eight rounds of ammunition are stowed on board, and two  outside.

In 2001 Japan reported to the United Nations Office for Disarmament Affairs that 140 Type 60s were in service.

Similar vehicles 
M50 Ontos

Notes

References

External links 

 Type 60 on OnWar.com

106 mm artillery
Tank destroyers
Japan Ground Self-Defense Force
Armoured fighting vehicles of Japan
Komatsu Limited
Military vehicles introduced in the 1960s